"Chasing Pirates" is the first single by American singer Norah Jones from her fourth album, The Fall. It was released exclusively to iTunes on Tuesday, October 13, 2009.  The song also had its North American radio station premiere on the defunct 97.3 EZ Rock, now CHBM, in Toronto, Ontario, Canada on October 9, 2009.  The song went top ten in Japan, The Netherlands and Belgium.  In the US, "Chasing Pirates" peaked at No. 13 on Hot Adult Contemporary Tracks and No. 7 on Jazz Songs.

"Chasing Pirates" was nominated for the Grammy Award for Best Female Pop Vocal Performance at the 53rd Annual Grammy Awards, becoming Jones's third nomination, after "Don't Know Why" and "Sunrise".

Background 
Norah Jones explained how "Chasing Pirates" came to be, "About a year ago, I did some demos in my home studio. I had some friends come in and we figured out a cool arrangement for 'Chasing Pirates,' with a cool drum part. It went somewhere I didn't expect it to go, and that became a direction to look in."

Music video 
October 27, 2009 VH1 aired the full version of Norah Jones's "Chasing Pirates" music video directed by Rich Lee.
In the beginning of the music video, she finds a map of Manhattan in a bottle while sitting on the couch in an apartment complex. In the next scene of the music video, she steers a building from a roof made to look like a pirate ship as she tries to find what is marked on the map. She also sits on deck before the roof transforms into a pirate ship. The music video also gained significant airplay on Australia's channel GO as filler time between programs in late 2009 and early 2010.

Performances 
She performed the song live on ABC's Dancing with the Stars on October 20, as well as Late Show with David Letterman on November 11, 2009, Good Morning America on November 16, 2009, The View on November 23, 2009, The Tonight Show with Conan O'Brien on December 15, 2009 and
Jimmy Kimmel Live!

Chart positions
The song entered the Adult Album Alternative charts on October 21, 2009 at #13. It became the highest entry by a female artist on that chart since Alanis Morissette's "Everything" in 2004. The last single by a female artist to chart at a higher position was another single by Jones, "Sunrise." The song entered on the Irish Singles Chart for the first time on #39.

Weekly charts

Year-end charts

References

Norah Jones songs
2009 singles
Songs written by Norah Jones
EMI Records singles
2009 songs
Blue Note Records singles
Song recordings produced by Jacquire King
Music videos directed by Rich Lee